Monique Bouet (née Yvinou; 10 June 1928 – 5 February 2021) was a French gymnast and schoolteacher. She competed in the women's artistic team all-around at the 1948 Summer Olympics.

Bouet was born in Quimper, Finistère, Brittany, France. She worked as a physical education teacher, and continued to host fitness classes until the age of 85.

References

External links
 

1928 births
2021 deaths
French schoolteachers
French female artistic gymnasts
Olympic gymnasts of France
Gymnasts at the 1948 Summer Olympics
20th-century French women